The 2019–20 season was Al-Fayha's 3rd season in the Pro League and their 66th season in existence. The club participated in the Pro League and the King Cup.

The season covered the period from 1 July 2019 to 9 September 2020.

Players

Squad information

Out on loan

Transfers and loans

Transfers in

Loans in

Transfers out

Loans out

Pre-season

Competitions

Overall

Overview

Goalscorers

Last Updated: 4 September 2020

Clean sheets

Last Updated: 4 September 2020

References

Al-Fayha FC seasons
Fayha